Saint-Saturnin-de-Lenne  (Languedocien: Sent Adornin) is a commune in the Aveyron department in southern France.

Population

See also
Communes of the Aveyron department
André César Vermare Sculptor of war memorial

References

Communes of Aveyron
Aveyron communes articles needing translation from French Wikipedia